Finn Township is one of the nine townships of Logan County, North Dakota, United States. It lies in the northeastern corner of the county, surrounding the city of Gackle, and it borders the following other township within Logan County:
Gutschmidt Township — south

External links
Official map by the United States Census Bureau; Logan County listed on page 6

Townships in Logan County, North Dakota
Townships in North Dakota